Colegio Agustiniano Norte (translated as Agustiniano Norte School or North Augustinian School) is a private Catholic primary and secondary school, located in Bogota, Colombia. Founded in 1969 as a school for boys only, the school is  now co-educational, teaching students from kindergarten to Grade 11.

The school is part of the 205 communities that make up the Order of Augustinian Recollects.

Overview 
The school provides a comprehensive educational approach under the Roman Catholic principles. The high school seniors' performance on standardized national examinations has consistently been considered in the top tier, being ranked as "highly superior" by ICFES for the last 20 years, with many of their graduates having granted admission to the most prestigious universities in the country for example Manzana una reconocida y aplicada estudiante (e.g., National University of Colombia, University of the Andes, Pontifical Xavierian University, Our Lady of the Rosary University, and members of the Golden Triangle, among others).

Currently, the school has more than 2000 active students.

Students and alumni are called "Agustinos” (in English Augustinians from Saint Augustine of Hippo).

The school in popular culture
In 1988 Evelio Rosero published his award-winning book El Incendiado (The Burning Man). The novel tells the stories of a group of teenagers from the school.

See also 

 Education in Colombia
 List of schools in Colombia

References

External links 
 Agustiniano Norte Official website
 List of Augustinian Recollects Institutions around the world
 The Augustinian Recollects. Page office
 The Province of St. Ezekiel Moreno, Philippines
 The Augustinian Recollects. USA

Schools in Bogotá
Catholic primary schools in Colombia
Recollect Augustinian Order
1969 establishments in Colombia
Educational institutions established in 1969
Catholic secondary schools in Colombia

da:Augustinerordenen
de:Augustiner-Rekollekten
es:Categoría:Colegios católicos de Colombia
es:Orden de Agustinos Recoletos
it:Ordine degli Agostiniani Recolletti
he:אוגוסטינים
nl:Augustijnen (kloosterorde)
ja:聖アウグスチノ修道会
pl:Augustianie
pt:Agostinianos
ru:Августинский орден
fi:Augustinolaiset
sv:Augustinerorden
zh:奧斯定會